George A. Vernicos (also Georgios Vernikos/ ; born 11 February 1950) is a well known Greek entrepreneur, social activist and politician from a shipowning family, originating from the island of Sifnos, elected as a deputy to the Hellenic Parliament in the Greek legislative election of June 2012.

He obtained a degree in economics from the University of Athens before furthering his studies at London University.

He has a daughter (by his ex-wife Demi), Marina, married to Miltos Kambourides.

He was appointed on 21 June 2012 as vice-minister for Merchant Marine and Aegean Affairs in Prime Minister Antonis Samaras's government before resigning over an offshore company scandal.  

George Vernicos currently is secretary general of the Association of Greek Tourism Enterprises (SETE), Member of the Board of the Hellenic Chamber of Shipping, President of the Economic and Social Council of Greece (ΟΚΕ) and honorary president of the Professional Hellenic Yacht Owners Association. He is also active in several organisations and chambers that aim towards the financial, cultural and social recovery of Greece and the defence of the citizens rights.

Additionally, he is chairman of Vernicos Yachts, the leading yachting company in Greece for sales and crewed yacht charters, as well as co-founding shareholder of Dolphin Capital Investors, the largest real estate investment company listed on AIM-London in terms of net assets. Vernicos Yachts S.A. started trading in the Athens Stock Market in 1996 until 2004 before the company changed name and scope of work. Under the name of a shady company in northern Greece "Leventakis Ekokkistiria" (cotton ginning plants) all valuable assets (45 yachts among other holdings) had been transferred to George A. Vernicos at a total loss for stockholders, for which he received a fine of 200.000 euros (overturned in 2013) and Leventakis Ekokkistiria flopped 30 months after the deal. 

George Vernicos was elected during the 80's as councilman and Vice-Mayor of the Municipality of Athens. He has served as President of the Hellenic Register of Shipping, an international organisation dedicated to the safeguarding of life and property at sea and the prevention of marine pollution, President of Attica Group, one of the biggest owners and operators of Ferries for passengers, cars and trucks worldwide, President of Nicolas E. Vernicos Shipping S.A., the oldest salvage and towage house in Greece and President of Free Holdings S.A., owners and operators of ocean cargo vessels, type Panamax and Handymax and Director of Sunsail International, one of the world's premier yachting companies.

In 1990, he co-established the Greenpeace office in Greece and he served for many years as board chair and trustee until June 2012. He was elected as honorary board chair of Greenpeace Greece. He has served as Director of the Greek National Tourist Organisation and as President of the Welfare Foundation G & A Hatzikonsta.

George Vernicos from a young age developed a remarkable activity over Democracy and rebels against the dictatorship. As a student he played a leading role at the liberation movement, thereby getting caught by the authorities and tortured. He has been honored by the Greek Parliament for his prominent role in the events that led to the restoration of Democracy in Greece.  On 27 February 2003, George Vernicos presented his book When we wanted to change Greece: The Greek European Youth Movement and the occupation of the Law School Athens. The book was published on the occasion of the thirty years since these events/ protests against the Greek military regime took place. In a very moving and symbolic gathering involving a large number of participants from all the age groups, in the amphitheatre Seripoulon of the Law School of Athens, youngsters from that period were brought together. They all paid tribute to their struggle for democracy and freedom and shared memories from the best time of their lives.

References

External links
 Official site

1950 births
Living people
Politicians from Athens
PASOK politicians
Greek businesspeople in shipping
Shipbuilders
National and Kapodistrian University of Athens alumni
Alumni of the University of London
Businesspeople from Athens